The women's 5000 metres at the 2006 European Athletics Championships were held at the Ullevi on August 12.

Medalists

Schedule

Results

Final

External links
Results

5000
5000 metres at the European Athletics Championships
2006 in women's athletics